Geohashing  is an outdoor recreational activity inspired by the webcomic xkcd, in which participants have to reach a random location (chosen by a computer algorithm), prove their achievement by taking a picture of a Global Positioning System (GPS) receiver or another mobile device and then tell the story of their trip online. Proof based on non-electronic navigation is also acceptable.

The geohashing community and culture is extremely tongue-in-cheek, supporting any kind of humorous behavior during the practice of geohashing and resulting in a parody of traditional outdoor activities. Navigating to a random point need not be pointless. Some geohashers document new mapping features they find on the OpenStreetMap project, clean up litter, or create art to commemorate the trip, among other activities.

A variation on geocaching, known as geodashing, features a closely comparable principle, with participants racing between coordinate points.

Invention and spread 

On May 21, 2008, the 426th xkcd comic was published. Titled "Geohashing", it described a way for a computer to create an algorithm that could generate random Global Positioning System (GPS) coordinates each day based on the Dow Jones Industrial Average and the current date. The algorithm was quickly seized by the xkcd community, which used it as intended by xkcd creator Randall Munroe.

Originally a stub where people willing to try the algorithm in real life were to issue their reports, the geohashing official wiki expanded in the following weeks and was a working website as early as June 2008. The current expedition protocol was then established during the following years, with the creation of humorous awards, regional meetups and a hall of amazingness for the various geohasher achievements.

Over time, geohashing gained fame across the internet and now counts more than 10,000 expedition reports, almost 15,000. Around 800 users are registered on the geohashing wiki, not all of which are currently active. Geohashing has spread mostly in North America, Europe and Australia, especially around cities.

Geohash 

Geohashing divides the earth into a grid made up of graticules which are one degree wide in latitude and longitude. Inside these graticules, a random location is set. Geohashers then have the opportunity to go at the chosen location, either inside their own graticule or in a nearby one. If the location is inaccessible or in a private area, geohashers are advised not to try to reach it, although obviously inaccessible locations have been reached several times. In addition to the repeating location in each graticule, each day there is a single global hashpoint, much more challenging to reach.

See also 

 Location-based game
 Benchmarking (geolocating)
 Degree Confluence Project (uses same grid)
 Orienteering
 Letterboxing

References

External links 

 Geohashing official wiki

Global Positioning System
hobbies
outdoor locating games